The Sulu jungle flycatcher (Cyornis ocularis) is a species of passerine bird in the Old World flycatcher family Muscicapidae. It is endemic to the Sulu Archipelago. Its natural habitat is subtropical or tropical moist montane forests.

The Sulu jungle flycatcher was split from the rufous-tailed jungle flycatcher (Cyornis rufocauda) as distinct species by the IOC in 2021.

References

Cyornis
Birds described in 1894
Endemic birds of the Philippines
Taxa named by Frank Swift Bourns
Taxa named by Dean Conant Worcester